Alexander "Sasha" Ustinov (born 7 December 1976) is a Russian professional boxer, former kickboxer and mixed martial artist. In boxing, he has challenged once for the WBA (Regular) heavyweight title in 2017.

Ustinov currently resides in Minsk, Belarus, but remains a Russian citizen and competes under the Russian flag.

Kickboxing career 
In 2003 after winning K-1 Moscow Grand Pix with three consecutive KO's Alexander Ustinov earned his spot at the K-1 World Grand Prix 2003 in Paris. In quarter finals he met Gregory Tony and won the fight by a second-round TKO. In the semi-final he stepped into the ring against his own sparring partner Alexey Ignashov and after the hard-fought battle the judges ruled the fight for Ignashov's favor.

In December 2003 he continued his strong performances at the tournaments winning the K-1 Spain GP in Barcelona.

On 7 August 2004 Alexander Ustinov was invited to participate at K-1 World GP 2004 Battle of Bellagio II. On his biggest tournament of his career, he was matched up against the towering South African fighter Jan "The Giant" Nortje. Alexander Ustinov won the battle but unfortunately was unable to continue due to a deep laceration on his shin and was replaced by the American Scott Lighty.

In 2005 he won two more K-1 tournaments in Milan, Italy and Lommel, Belgium as well as made his professional boxing debut.

Professional boxing career 
Alexander Ustinov made his professional boxing debut on 13 May 2005 at the age of 29. He scored a second round TKO win in his first bout. On 26 February 2009, he won the EBF heavyweight title by stopping Ukrainian Maksym Pedyura in five rounds. Ustinov made two successful defences of that title against Italian Paolo Vidoz and Russian Denis Bakhtov. In his 19th professional contest he defeated American future heavyweight title challenger  Monte Barrett by unanimous decision.

Usitnov vs. Pulev 
Ustinov suffered his first defeat in his 28th contest to Bulgarian Kubrat Pulev via 11th round knockout in September 2009.

Ustinov vs. Tua 
In 2013, he scored the biggest win of his career by outpointing hard punching New Zealander-Samoan David Tua, which was the final fight of Tua's career as he announced his retirement after the fight.

Ustinov vs. Charr 
On 25 November 2017, he unsuccessfully challenged for the WBA (Regular) heavyweight title, losing a unanimous decision to Syrian Manuel Charr.

On 26 July 2014, he was to scheduled to fight Tyson Fury as a late replacement for the injured Derek Chisora. However, Tyson Fury pulled out of the fight due to the ill health and eventual death of his uncle, Hughie Fury.

Ustinov vs. Hunter 
On 24 November, 2018, Ustinov faced Michael Hunter. Hunter scored two knockdowns over Ustinov and won the fight via TKO in the ninth round.

Ustinov vs. Joyce 
On 18 May, 2019, Ustinov faced WBC #15 at heavyweight, Joe Joyce. Joyce's power was too much for Ustinov, as Joyce dominated him en route to a third round TKO victory.

Titles

Boxing
 WBA International heavyweight champion
 EBA (European Boxing Association) heavyweight champion

Kickboxing
World Full Contact Association
 2006 WFCA Super Heavyweight World title
International Federation of Muaythai Amateur
 2006 IFMA World Amateur Champion
K-1
 2006 K-1 Fighting Network in Marseilles Champion
 2005 K-1 Italy Oktagon Champion
 2004 K-1 Poland Champion
 2003 K-1 Spain Grand Prix in Barcelona Champion
 2003 K-1 World Grand Prix Preliminary Moscow Champion
World Kickboxing Network
 2004 WKN European Muay Thai Champion
World Kickboxing Federation
 2003 WKBF Golden Panther Cup (+91 kg) Champion
International Amateur Muay Thai Federation
 2003 IAMTF World Amateur Muay Thai Champion

Kickboxing record

Mixed martial arts record

Professional boxing record

References

External links

Alexander Ustinov profile at K-1
Alexander Ustinov - Profile, News Archive & Current Rankings at Box.Live

1976 births
Living people
Heavyweight boxers
Russian male kickboxers
Heavyweight kickboxers
Russian male mixed martial artists
Super heavyweight mixed martial artists
Mixed martial artists utilizing boxing
Mixed martial artists utilizing Muay Thai
Russian Muay Thai practitioners
Sportspeople from Novosibirsk
Russian male boxers
Russian expatriate sportspeople in Belarus